Imre Csík (6 March 1912 – 29 March 1964) was a Hungarian alpine skier who competed in the 1936 Winter Olympics.

References

1912 births
1964 deaths
Hungarian male alpine skiers
Olympic alpine skiers of Hungary
Alpine skiers at the 1936 Winter Olympics